CSEA may refer to:
 California School Employees Association
 California State Employees Association
 Civil Service Employees Association (AFSCME Local 1000)
 Computer Science and Engineering Association, IIT Guwahati